Martin Vidović (born 15 July 1953) is a Croatian prelate of the Catholic Church who was Apostolic Nuncio to Belarus from 2004 to 2011.

Martin Vidović was born on 15 July 1953 in Vidonje, Croatia. He was ordained a priest on 28 May 1989.

He managed Croatian-language programming for Vatican Radio from 1983 to 1994. He then entered the diplomatic service of the Holy See on 19 September 1994. Among other assignments, he was secretary of the nunciature in Bosnia-Herzegovina from 1994 to 1999.

On 15 September 2004, Pope John Paul II named him titular bishop of Nona and Apostolic Nuncio to Belarus. He received his episcopal consecration from Cardinal Angelo Sodano on 21 November at the Cathedral of St. Peter in Split.

He resigned as nuncio in 2011 after meeting with the country's political opposition as Vatican Secretary of State Cardinal Tarcisio Bertone and Pope Benedict XVI sought to negotiate with the government of Belarus President Alexander Lukashenko.

See also
 List of heads of the diplomatic missions of the Holy See

References

External links
 Catholic Hierarchy: Archbishop Martin Vidović 

Living people
1953 births
Apostolic Nuncios to Belarus